The TV Today Network is an English-Hindi Indian news television network based in India. It is listed on the BSE and the NSE and consists of the several news channels namely, Aaj Tak (Hindi), India Today Television (English), Good News Today (Hindi), Aaj Tak HD (Hindi) and a approved channel name Aajtak Desh (Multi language).

The network is largely owned by the Arun Purie controlled Living Media India Limited (d.b.a. India Today Group) which publishes India Today magazine.

History

Newstrack 
The TV Today Network was incorporated in 1988, launching a video magazine called Newstrack.
At that time, private television broadcasting was prohibited in India.
Newstrack produced its programmes on videotape and distributed them to subscribers. The New York Times described them as fast-paced video magazines of investigative reporting, similar to CBS News's "60 Minutes".

Madhu Trehan, a sibling of Arun Purie and a graduate of Columbia University Graduate School of Journalism, was the creator of Newstrack and also served as one of its anchors.
Having started with five to six journalists, it grew to a size of 30. The length of the programmes also increased from initial 30 minutes to eventual 90 minutes. The high points of Newstrack'''s coverage were those of Kashmiri militancy and the demolition of Babri Masjid.

 Aaj Tak Aaj Tak started in 1995 as a privately produced Hindi news and current affairs programme that aired on Doordarshan. It was aired at 10 pm everyday on the DD Metro channel, starting 17 July 1995. By 1999, it had produced 1000 episodes.

In 1998, Subah Aaj Tak was started as a morning news programme for DD Metro. It was a 45-minute programme covering business, politics, sports, entertainment and human interest stories.

On 31 December 2000, Aaj Tak was launched as a full 24-hour Hindi news and current affairs channel.

 References 

 External links 
 TV Today website
 TV Today at India Today Group
 Newstrack coverage – Reporting from Kashmir, 1889 to 1994'': Part 1, Part 2,  Part 3, 

India Today Group
1988 establishments in India
Television broadcasting companies of India
Mass media companies of India
Broadcasting